Capo Focardo Lighthouse is an active lighthouse located at the south eastern tip of the gulf of Porto Azzurro on the island of Elba in the Tuscan Archipelago.

Description
The tower and the lantern are white and the lantern dome is grey metallic. The lighthouse is completely automated and managed by the Marina Militare with the identification code number 2040 E.F.

See also
 List of lighthouses in Italy

References

External links
 Servizio Fari Marina Militare

Lighthouses in Italy
Buildings and structures in Tuscany
Porto Azzurro
Lighthouses in Tuscany